Albanian Air Sport Federation is the governing body for the sport of Air sports in Albania and member of the Fédération Aéronautique Internationale (FAI).It was founded in 2010 in Tirana.

Membership

Current members who are part of the Albanian Air Sports Federation:

National AeroClub of Albania (Aeronautika Shqiptare)
Aeroclub of Durres
Aeroclub of Tirana
Aeroclub of Gjirokastra
Aircadet Albania
Albanian Aeromodeling

References

External links
 

Air Sports
Air sports
Sports organizations established in 2010